Augustino were a rock band from Auckland, New Zealand, best known for their 2002 single "Into the Grain".

History 

Augustino was formed in 1999 after Sean Clarke (vocals, guitar) and Joel Halstead (guitar, keyboard, vocals) started performing together. They were soon joined by drummer Wade Shotter, guitarist Gareth Price (who originally joined as a bassist) and bass player Marcus Joyce. After the band's early demo recordings, Joyce left the band and was replaced by Nick Buckton. 

The band were signed to TaylorTalk Productions, the label of Auckland radio programme Robert Taylor, with marketing and distribution through Sony. The band initially released four singles in the early 2000s, with "Into the Grain" being the only single to chart and to appear on their subsequent album One Day Over. The brand received a $50,000 grant from NZ On Air for the production of One Day Over in 2003.  A further three singles were released from the album. 

The band were known for their innovative music videos, which were directed by drummer Wade Shotter. Augustino received funding of $5000 from NZ On Air for the production of each of their seven music videos.  The video for "The Silent Film" was nominated for Best Video at the 2001 New Zealand Music Awards.

After Augustino 

Augustino have not released any new material since 2004. In 2005 Sean Clarke formed the three-piece Flammable Tramp. Joel Halstead is the guitarist in Auckland band Ekko Park. Wade Shotter works as a TV commercial and music video director. Gareth Price is a visual artist. Nick Buckton is a solo musician. Marcus Joyce has played with the Boxcar Guitars, Demi-Whores and the Drab Doo-Riffs.

Discography

Albums

EPs

Singles

References 

New Zealand rock music groups
Sony Music New Zealand artists